Kader Nouni (born 23 February 1976) is a French tennis umpire. He works primarily for the Women's Tennis Association (WTA) and has officiated six major finals. The International Tennis Federation (ITF) certified him as a gold badge umpire in 2007. Known for his baritone voice, Nouni is sometimes called the "Barry White of tennis".

Early life
Nouni was born to Algerian-French immigrants on 23 February 1976. He grew up in the Haut Vernet quarter of Perpignan, in southern France. Nouni and his elder brother, Miloud, were raised in public housing by a single mother; his father died when he was two.

Basketball was an early interest, but Nouni and his brother additionally took up tennis after Frenchman Yannick Noah's victory at the 1983 French Open. Costs associated with tennis (lessons, court rental, etc.) meant Nouni needed to work from a young age; by age nine, he would string rackets, sweep the court lines, and do other jobs at a local tennis club. Local tournaments began to hire him to officiate adult matches from age 12. Nouni recalled that despite his youth, early on he got positive feedback from players for his umpiring skills. Nouni developed his trademark deep voice by his mid-teens; he recalled an incident when a girlfriend's father disbelieved over the phone that he was only sixteen.

Career

As a 16-year-old, Nouni got his first major umpiring experience as a line judge at the 1992 French Open, after being recognized for good officiating at a junior tennis event that had been held the year prior at Roland Garros in Paris. Before he dedicated himself to officiating, Nouni briefly studied sociology at the university level.

Over time, Nouni worked his way as a chair umpire from qualifying competitions to the main draws of WTA and Association of Tennis Professionals (ATP) events to Grand Slams. He became a full-time umpire in 2005; in off-seasons past, Nouni sometimes supplemented his income with work in bars in Perpignan. The ITF accredits umpires at different levels; Nouni earned his white badge (Level 2) in 1998, bronze badge (Level 3) in 2002, silver badge in 2004, and gold badge (highest level) in 2007. He joined the WTA Tour exclusively in 2008, but still sometimes officiates men's matches at Grand Slams.

Nouni has umpired five women's singles finals at the French Open: 2007, 2009, 2013, 2014, and 2021. Outside of Roland Garros, the only other major final he has officiated was Wimbledon 2018. His other high-profile matches on the WTA Tour include presiding over four season-ending WTA Finals finals.

Nouni has been involved in several notable moments of controversy. At the 2012 Australian Open, after Nouni overruled a line judge to award John Isner an ace and declined to allow a late Hawk-Eye challenge, David Nalbandian argued at length with Nouni and said postmatch that the umpire had mismanaged that moment. At the 2015 French Open, Victoria Azarenka thought she had saved a set point after a miss by Serena Williams, but because a line judge made a late incorrect call on Azarenka's previous shot, Nouni had the players replay the point (instead of awarding it to Azarenka outright).

Recognition
Nouni's deep baritone voice, fashion sense, and personality have helped make him one of the most famous tennis umpires today. The Guardian writes, "With his smoky tones, he's been praised for having the best voice in tennis". Other sources describe his tone as "honeyed", "resonant and melodic", "seductive", and "soothing", and note his thick French accent. Nouni's pronunciation of "deuce" is especially striking to some fans. John McEnroe once joked, "[Nouni]'s got the great voice, I'll give him that ... He's an argument for smoking cigarettes if you're an umpire". Nouni used to worry that his voice could distract from his job, noting "We always say that a good official is someone that we don't talk about", but has since learned to appreciate the fan interest. Because of his deep voice, he is sometimes referred to as the "Barry White of tennis".

Personal life
Nouni met his wife, Melanie Conesa, in 2010. They have two children. , when Nouni is not traveling, he lives with his family in Perpignan.

References

1976 births
Living people
French referees and umpires
French sportspeople of Algerian descent
French tennis people
Sportspeople from Perpignan